Fedor Holz (born 25 July 1993) is a German professional poker player, originally from Saarbrücken, who focuses on high roller tournaments. He was ranked by Pocketfives.com as the best online MTT player in 2014 and 2015. In July 2016, Holz won his first WSOP bracelet, in the $111,111 High Roller For One Drop, winning $4,981,775.

Poker
Holz had his first live cash in 2012 at the €500 No Limit Hold'em GPT II Deepstack Series Main Event, where he finished second for €15,320. Holz plays online under the alias CrownUpGuy. In September 2014, he won the World Championship of Online Poker for $1.3 million. In 2015, Holz finished 25th in the World Series of Poker Main Event, cashing for $262,574.

In 2016, Fedor won the Triton Super High Roller for $3,463,500 in January, and finished runner up in the Super High Roller Bowl for $3,500,000 later that year. Holz won his first WSOP bracelet in the $111,111 High Roller for One-Drop event and earned $4,981,775 for the victory.  Holz's biggest cash was in 2018 at the $1,000,000 No Limit Hold'em - The Big One for One Drop for $6,000,000.

As of March 2020, Holz is first on the German all-time money list with career live tournament winnings of over $32,500,000.

World Series of Poker

An "O" following a year denotes bracelet(s) won during the World Series of Poker Online

Personal life
Holz was born in Germany and currently resides in Vienna, Austria.

References

External links 
Fedor Holz Hendon Mob profile

Fedor Holz Interview

1993 births
German poker players
World Series of Poker bracelet winners
People from Saarbrücken
Game players from Vienna
Living people